Zappalà or Zappala is a surname. Notable people with the surname include:

Frank J. Zappala, American politician and lawyer 
Gregorio Zappalà (1833–1908), Italian sculptor
Stefano Zappalà (1941–2018), Italian politician and Member of the European Parliament for Central with the Forza Italia
Stephen Zappala, American Democratic politician and attorney who is the District Attorney of Allegheny County, Pennsylvania
Stephen Zappala Sr., American lawyer and former Pennsylvania Supreme Court Chief Justice
Vincenzo Zappalà (born 1945), Italian astronomer

See also
2813 Zappalà, main belt asteroid with an orbital period of 2030
Zapala